The 2012 Faysal Bank Super Eight T20 Cup was the second season of the Faysal Bank Super Eight T20 Cup, a domestic Twenty20 cricket tournament organized by the Pakistan Cricket Board. The season began on 25 March 2012 and was held at the Rawalpindi Cricket Stadium in Rawalpindi. 15 matches were played during the tournament.

Sialkot Stallions won the tournament after beating Karachi Dolphins in the final, and, therefore, qualified for the 2012 Champions League Twenty20.

Venue
All the matches were played at Rawalpindi Cricket Stadium, Rawalpindi.

Squads
The squads are as follows:

Misbah-ul-Haq (c)
Ali Raza
Ali Waqas
Asad Ali
Asif Ali
Farrukh Shehzad
Imran Ali
Imran Khalid
Jahandad Khan
Khurram Shehzad
Mohammad Hafeez
Mohammad Salman (wk)
Mohammad Talha
Naved Latif
Sabir Hussain
Saeed Ajmal
Shahid Nazir
Waqas Maqsood

Umar Gul (c)
Afaq Ahmed
Aftab Alam
Akbar Badshah
Gauhar Ali (wk)
Imran Khan
Israrullah
Jamaluddin
Mohammad Aslam
Mohammad Fayyaz
Mohammad Rizwan
Musadiq Ahmed
Rafatullah Mohmand
Riaz Afridi
Sajjad Ahmed
Shoaib Khan
Waqar Ahmed
Zohaib Khan

Kamran Akmal (c & wk)
Abdul Razzaq
Adnan Rasool
Ahmed Shehzad
Aizaz Cheema
Asif Yousuf
Fahad-ul-Haq
Imran Ali
Jahangir Mirza
Kashif Siddiq
Nasir Jamshed
Jamshed Ahmed
Raza Ali Dar
Sohail Ahmed
Tanzeel Altaf
Umar Akmal
Wahab Riaz

Hasan Raza (c)
Adnan Baig
Akbar-ur-Rehman
Anwar Ali
Atif Maqbool
Azam Hussain
Danish Kaneria
Fahad Iqbal
Faisal Iqbal
Fakhar Zaman
Khurram Manzoor
Rameez Aziz
Mohammad Hasan (wk)
Saeed Bin Nasir
Uzair-ul-Haq
Zohaib Shera
Tabish Khan

Shoaib Malik (c)
Abdur Rehman
Ali Akbar
Ali Khan
Haris Sohail
Imran Nazir
Kamran Younis
Kashif Sohail
Mansoor Amjad
Mohammad Ayub
Naved-ul-Hasan
Naved Arif
Qaiser Abbas
Raza Hasan
Rizwan Sultan
Sarfraz Ahmed
Shahid Yousuf
Shakeel Ansar (wk)

Taufeeq Umar (c)
Adnan Akmal (wk)
Adnan Raza
Ali Azmat
Asif Ashfaq
Asif Raza
Azhar Ali
Emmad Ali
Fahad Masood
Hamza Paracha
Imran Farhat
Junaid Zia
Kamran Sajid
Mohammad Khalil
Mustafa Iqbal
Saad Nasim
Usman Salahuddin
Waqas Aslam

Mohammad Sami (c)
Ahmed Iqbal
Asad Baig
Asad Shafiq
Faraz Ahmed
Fawad Alam
Haaris Ayaz
Javed Mansoor
Khalid Latif
Mir Hamza
Rameez Raja
Rumman Raees
Sarfraz Ahmed (wk)
Shahzaib Hasan
Sohail Khan
Sheharyar Ghani
Tanvir Ahmed
Tariq Haroon

Sohail Tanvir (c)
Umar Amin
Adnan Mufti
Awais Zia
Babar Naeem
Hammad Azam
Jamal Anwar (wk)
Mohammad Ayaz
Mohammad Nawaz
Mohammad Rameez
Nasir Malik
Naved Malik
Samiullah
Tahir Rauf
Umair Mushtaq
Yasim Murtaza
Yasir Arafat
Zahid Mansoor

 Mohammad Sami replaced Shahid Afridi as Karachi Dolphins captain.

Results

Teams and standings

 Qualified for semifinals
Full table on ESPNCricinfo

Fixtures
All match times in Pakistan Standard Time (UTC+5:30).

Group stage

Group A

Group B

Knockout stage

Semi-finals

Final

Karachi Dolphins won the toss and elected to bat, and the decision seemed to have paid off when they powered past 60 in the Powerplay. Their attack was led by opener Khalid Latif, who carried his bat through the innings to finish with 81 off 59. The main support was provided by Shahzaib Hasan and Asad Shafiq, who scored 30 and 38 respectively. They made 167 for 8 in 20 overs. Raza Hasan's 4 wickets came for 33 runs.

Chasing 168, Sialkot Stallions lost Shakeel Ansar early but took control thereafter. Imran Nazir scored a rapid 41 (20 balls), before an unbroken stand of 119 at close to nine an over between Shoaib Malik (62) and Haris Sohail (55) sealed the game in the 19th over.

For the final, 20,000-odd people thronged the Rawalpindi Cricket Stadium, with its newly renovated stands. There were a further 15,000 fans outside the stadium, doing their best to catch glimpses of the action.

Statistics

References

External links
 Faysal Bank Super Eight T-20 Cup 2011/12 – ESPNCricinfo
 Faysal Bank National Super-8 T20 – Daily Times (Pakistan)

2012 in Pakistani cricket
Domestic cricket competitions in 2011–12
2012 Super 8 Twenty20 Cup
Pakistani cricket seasons from 2000–01